"A Corner of the Garden" is an American television play broadcast on April 23, 1959 as part of the CBS television series, Playhouse 90.  The cast includes Eileen Heckart and Gary Merrill. Robert Stevens was the director and Tad Mosel the writer.

Plot
After the death of her mother, a teenage girl, Barbara, moves in with her mother's best friend, Dorothy. Barbara learns how Dorothy dominates the family. The husband, Louis, is a whipped and beaten man. Dorothy encourages Louis to venture from his corner of the garden, and the two have an affair.

Cast
The cast included the following:

 Eileen Heckart - Dorothy
 Gary Merrill - Louis
 Susan Gordon - Lorraine
 Tommy Kirk - Jack
 Heather Sears - Barbara

Production
The program aired on April 23, 1959, on the CBS television series Playhouse 90. Tad Mosel was the writer and Robert Stevens the director.

References

1959 American television episodes
Playhouse 90 (season 3) episodes
1959 television plays